Brian Large (born 16 February 1939 in London, England) is a television director and author. He is among the world's foremost TV directors specializing in opera and classical music.

Biography

Studies
Large studied at the Royal Academy of Music in London, where he was appointed a Fellow of the Royal Academy in 1991. After graduating from the University of London with doctorates in both music and philosophy, he did postgraduate work in Vienna and Prague. His interest in Czech and Slavic opera resulted in the publication of two pioneering volumes on the music of Bedřich Smetana and Bohuslav Martinů.

BBC 1965–1980
He joined BBC2 television as a director with responsibility for music and opera at its inception in 1965. He was appointed chief opera producer in 1970. During this period he televised:

 Burning Fiery Furnace, Idomeneo and Peter Grimes (with Pears and Britten)
 La traviata (Harwood)
 Macbeth (Johnson, Shicoff, Bailey, Ghiaurov)
 Amahl and the Night Visitors, Hänsel und Gretel (Johns, Bailey)
 Love for Three Oranges and Der fliegende Holländer (Johns, Bailey)

In 1966 the BBC commissioned an opera for television from Benjamin Britten. In August 1970 Owen Wingrave, op.85 (libretto: Britten/Piper, based on a short story by Henry James) was completed. He directed and televised the world premiere conducted by the composer in November 1970. It was first broadcast on BBC2 on 16 May 1971.

During his time at the Corporation Large directed for Britain's Royal Opera:

 Tosca (Jurinac)
 Aida (Jones, Bumbry, Craig; Downes) and
 Otello (Cossutto, Cappuccilli; Downes).

He directed numerous programmes by Sir Frederick Ashton and Sir Kenneth MacMillan from The Royal Ballet, including:

 Cinderella (Collier, Dowell)
 Sleeping Beauty (Sibley)
 "Elite Syncopations" (Mason).

He worked with Margot Fonteyn and Rudolf Nureyev. At the BBC he also directed numerous live telecasts of concerts with:

 Claudio Abbado (Prokoviev's Piano Concerto No.3 with Martha Argerich)
 Daniel Barenboim (Dvořák Cello Concerto with du Pre)
 Sir John Barbirolli (Elgar symphonies and orchestral works by Delius)
 Leonard Bernstein (Stravinsky's "The Rite of Spring", Shostakovich's Symphony No 5, Sibelius' Symphony No 5)
 Sir Adrian Boult (Elgar's The Dream of Gerontius with Baker, Pears and Shirley-Quirk; symphonies by Elgar and Vaughan Williams)
 Benjamin Britten (Tschaikowsky's Rococo Variations with Rostropovich; and symphonies)
 Sir Colin Davis (Shostakovich's Cello Concerti 1 & 2 with Rostropovich)
 Kirill Kondrashin (Brahms' "Double Concerto" with Oistrakh and Rostropovich)
 Igor Stravinsky (his "Firebird Ballet") and
 Sir William Walton (his Belshazar's Feast).

International networks and opera companies
Wolfgang Wagner in 1974 invited Large to Bayreuth to collaborate on documenting the works of his grandfather Richard Wagner on television:
 Die Meistersinger von Nürnberg (twice: Kollo and Jerusalem) initiated a series that over twelve years included
 Tannhäuser (Studer, Versalle, Brendel, Sotin, Sinopoli)
 Parsifal (Jerusalem; Stein)
 Der fliegende Holländer (Estes, Balslev, Salminen, Schunk; Nelson)
 Lohengrin (twice: Stein and Nelson)

and, perhaps, one of the most acclaimed programs in the history of classical music on television:

 Der Ring des Nibelungen (Boulez/Chéreau)
For the latter the Royal Television Society named him "Best Television Director" in 1981.

Since leaving the BBC in 1980, Large has continued to direct telecasts for the Royal Opera, including:

 Les Contes d'Hoffmann (Domingo, Baltsa; Prêtre)
 La bohème (Cotrubaș, Shicoff; Gardelli)
 Die Fledermaus (Te Kanawa, Prey; Mehta)
 Der Rosenkavalier (Te Kanawa; Solti)
 Aida (Studer; Downes)
 Don Carlo (Cotrubaș, Lima; Haitink)
 Falstaff (Bruson; Giulini)
 Luisa Miller (Ricciarelli, Domingo, Bruson; Maazel).
 Roméo et Juliette (Alagna; Mackerras)
 Lorin Maazel's world premiere of 1984 (Keenlyside, Damrau; Maazel)
 Otello (Te Kanawa, Domingo; Solti)
 Simon Boccanegra (Te Kanawa; Solti)
 Stiffelio and Il trovatore (Cura, Hvorostovsky; Rizzi).

From the Glyndebourne Festival he has televised The Makropulos Case (Silia; Sir Andrew Davis) and Le comte Ory (Massis; Sir Andrew Davis).

Following the internationally televised Royal Opera House Gala for the Queen's Silver Jubilee in 1977, invitations came to direct performing arts programs for numerous TV networks and opera companies, including:

 Vienna State Opera
 Vienna Volksoper 
 Wiener Festwochen (1995, 1996)
 Theater an der Wien
 Vienna Philharmonic concerts in Salzburg (1996, 1998–2000, 2002, 2005–2006)
Salzburger Festspiele, opera productions (1980–2010)
 Bregenzer Festspiele where he televised La Bohème (Villazón; awarded the 2003 "Grand Prix" Golden Prague Award)
 Mozartwochen Salzburg 2006 and
 Musikverein (1989–2009).

Large directed for the Vienna Philharmonic Orchestra its annual New Year's Concert from 1989 to 1993; and again from 1997 to 2009; and in 2011. In Germany he has directed for ZDF from Deutsche Oper Berlin and two concerts at the Dresdner Frauenkirche with Angela Gheorghiu and Cecilia Bartoli. Brian Large televised for Bayerischer Rundfunk from Bayerische Staatsoper, Prinzregententheater and Staatstheater am Gärtnerplatz and two special concerts from the Vatican honoring Pope Benedict XVI (Jansons 27 October 2007 ; Thielemann) as well as the Opening Concert of the 2006 World Cup Games (Domingo, Damrau, Lang Lang; Jansons, Mehta, Thielemann).

He directed opera productions from La Scala among others Nabucco (Dimitrova, Bruson ; Muti) and from the Arena di Verona Madame Butterfly (Kabaivanska) and Tosca (Marton, Aragall). From the Mariinsky Theatre, St. Petersburg, Large has televised opera under the musical direction of Valery Gergiev including Pique Dame and the original "St. Petersburg" version of La forza del destino as well as ballet: Jewels (ballet) and Don Quixote. At the Théâtre du Châtelet in Paris he directed The Cunning Little Vixen (Mackerras, Hytner); Alceste (von Otter; Gardiner) and Orphée et Eurydice (Kožená, Gardiner). From the Théâtre des Champs-Élysées he televised "Viva Vivaldi" with Cecilia Bartoli.

Since 1979 Large has directed over 80 opera-, recital- and gala-telecasts from the Metropolitan Opera New York with James Levine and he has televised the 1983–84 Spring Centennial Gala, the 1991 25th Anniversary Gala, the 1996 James Levine's 25th Anniversary gala, the 1998 Pavarotti's 30th Anniversary gala and the 2006 Farewell Gala to General Manager Joseph Volpe.

In the United States Large has televised operas from the:
 Los Angeles Opera
 San Francisco Opera
 Houston Grand Opera
 Lyric Opera of Chicago
 Washington National Opera and from the
 Philadelphia Opera

as well as concerts from the:
 Chicago Symphony
 Los Angeles Philharmonic
 San Francisco Symphony
 Philadelphia Orchestra

and a decade of Opening Night gala events from:
 Carnegie Hall.

Renowned conductors and orchestras he has worked with include:
 Claudio Abbado (Vienna Philharmonic Orchestra; Berliner Philharmoniker)
 Daniel Barenboim (BerlinerPhilharmoniker; London Symphony Orchestra)
 Pierre Boulez (Vienna Philharmonic Orchestra)
 Valery Gergiev (Vienna Philharmonic Orchestra; Berliner Philharmoniker)
 Bernard Haitink (Berliner Philharmoniker; London Philharmonic Orchestra)
 Nikolaus Harnoncourt (Vienna Philharmonic Orchestra)
 Mariss Jansons (Vienna Philharmonic Orchestra, Symphonieorchester des Bayerischen Rundfunks)
 Carlos Kleiber (Vienna Philharmonic Orchestra)
 James Levine (Metropolitan Opera)
 Sir Neville Marriner (Academy of St Martin in the Fields, Dresdner Staatskapelle)
 Riccardo Muti (Vienna Philharmonic Orchestra; Philadelphia Orchestra)
 Seiji Ozawa (Vienna Philharmonic Orchestra; Boston Symphony Orchestra)
 Georges Prêtre (Vienna Philharmonic Orchestra; Berliner Philharmoniker)
 Sir Simon Rattle (Vienna Philharmonic Orchestra; Berliner Philharmoniker)
 Sir Georg Solti (Berliner Philharmoniker; Chicago Symphony Orchestra; London Philharmonic Orchestra)

Awards and honors
Large has received two primetime Emmy Awards:
 1992 for The Metropolitan Opera Silver Anniversary Gala (Levine, 1991) (TV) at Lincoln Center for Outstanding Individual Achievement – Classical Music/ Dance Programming – Directing; and again in 1993 for the live transmission of Tosca conducted by Zubin Mehta (1992) (TV) from Rome, seen worldwide on 106 television networks, and for Outstanding Individual Achievement – Classical Music/ Dance Programming – Directing, (shared with Giuseppe Patroni Griffi (director)).

Other honors:
 1986 Large received a Peabody Award for the live CBS telecast "Sunday Morning: Vladimir Horowitz" (1986) from the famed Grand Hall of the Moscow Conservatory.
 1981 The British Television Society recognized Large as "Best Television Director" for the Chéreau/ Boulez production of Der Ring des Nibelungen;
 1990 for "The Three Tenors" FIFA world cup concert on 7 July 1990 from the Bath of Caracalla in Rome and again in
 1993 for Stiffelio (Carreras) from Covent Garden ,
 further with its Judges' Award (Programme) for outstanding achievement in the field of television direction.
 1990 The British Academy of Film and Television Arts/BAFTA recognized Large as "Best Television Director" for "The Three Tenors".

For the 'excellence of his opus of more than 600 programmes,' the 44th annual Golden Prague Festival in June 2007 honored Large with a special tribute for his contribution to the industry, and named his 2006 Salzburg DVD of Mozart's Le nozze di Figaro "Best Performing Arts Programme – Opera". In 1985 the French government named Large a Chevalier de l'Ordre des Arts et des Lettres.

Publications
 Smetana (London, 1970)
 Martinů (London, 1975)

Large wrote the Grove Dictionary'''s entry on Martinů.

He has also translated the libretto to Wagner's The Flying Dutchman.

Videography
 Mozart: Idomeneo (1982), Deutsche Grammophon DVD, 00440-073-4234
 The Metropolitan Opera Gala 1991, Deutsche Grammophon DVD, 00440-073-4582
 Dvořák in Prague: A Celebration (1993), Kultur Video DVD, D4211
 James Levine's 25th Anniversary Metropolitan Opera Gala (1996), Deutsche Grammophon DVD, B0004602-09

Filmography
A filmography of Large's TV opera and concert productions of more than 150 titles covering the years 1970 to 2009 is available on The Internet Movie Database IMDb / Brian Large.

References

External links

Brian Large at The New York Times'' Movies database
IMG Artists, Brian Large's management

1939 births
Living people
Film directors from London
Chevaliers of the Ordre des Arts et des Lettres
Alumni of the Royal Academy of Music
Fellows of the Royal Academy of Music